Choi Han is a South Korean voice actor who joined the Munhwa Broadcasting Corporation's Voice Acting Division in 1999. He voices David Hodges in the Korea TV Edition of CSI: Crime Scene Investigation replacing Wallace Langham. He won Best TV Voice Actor at the 2009 MBC Drama Awards for CSI: Crime Scene Investigation.

Roles

Broadcast TV
 (Tooniverse original network) - Choi Min-hwan
Spider-Man (Korea TV Edition, MBC) 
CSI: Crime Scene Investigation (replacing Wallace Langham, Korea TV Edition, MBC) 
Nalong (Nalong: Fly to the sky) (MBC)
Nalong 2 (Longman: The Little Big Hero) (MBC)
Maxman (KBS) 
Mr. Bogus (Korea Edition) - Additional Voices
Ojamajo Doremi (Korea TV Edition, MBC)
Bikkuriman (Korea TV Edition, MBC) 
Atlantis Prince (MBC) 
Submarine 707 (MBC)
Tommy & Oscar (Korea TV Edition, MBC)
Widget (Korea TV Edition) - Elder#1, Additional Voices

Movie dubbing
Funeral (film) (replacing Venecio Del Toro, Korea TV Edition, MBC)
After the Sunset (replacing Woody Harrelson, Korea TV Edition, MBC)
Chicago (2002 film) (replacing John C. Reilly, Korea TV Edition, MBC)
Master and Commander: The Far Side of the World (replacing Paul Bettany, Korea TV Edition, MBC)

Video Games
James Raynor, Viking in StarCraft II: Wings of Liberty
Announcer of Super Smash Bros. Brawl
Dainsleif in Genshin Impact
Tea Knight Cookie in Cookie Run: Kingdom
Lee in Arknights
Gregor Samsa in Limbus Company

See also
Munhwa Broadcasting Corporation
MBC Voice Acting Division

Homepage
MBC Voice Acting Division Choi Han Blog(in Korean)
Ad Sound Choi Han Blog (in Korean)

Living people
South Korean male voice actors
Year of birth missing (living people)